The 1990–91 NC State Wolfpack men's basketball team represented North Carolina State University as a member of the Atlantic Coast Conference during the 1990–91 men's college basketball season. It was Les Robinson's first season as head coach. The Wolfpack earned a bid to the NCAA tournament and finished with a record of 20–11 (8–6 ACC).

Roster

Schedule

|-
!colspan=9 style=| Regular Season

|-
!colspan=9 style=| ACC Tournament

|-
!colspan=9 style=| NCAA Tournament

Rankings

NBA draft

References

NC State Wolfpack men's basketball seasons
Nc State
NC State Wolfpack men's basketball
NC State Wolfpack men's basketball
Nc State